Now is the fifth full-length studio album released by Christian rock band Fireflight released on March 6, 2012 on Flicker Records. It is their fastest selling and highest charting album to date. As of July 15, 2012 the album has sold more than 40,000 copies.

A special Colorado Mix of "He Weeps" was released on July 24, 2012 for airplay on Air 1.

Track listing

References

Fireflight albums
2012 albums